William 'Billy' Rose (born 8 December 1934) is a former English cricketer.  Rose was a left-handed batsman who bowled slow left-arm orthodox.  He was born in Great Yarmouth, Norfolk.

Rose made his debut for Norfolk in the 1963 Minor Counties Championship against Hertfordshire.  Rose played Minor counties cricket for Norfolk from 1963 to 1978, which included 96 Minor Counties Championship appearances.  He made his List A debut against Hampshire in the 1965 Gillette Cup.  He was dismissed for 2 runs by Bob Cottam in this match.  He made a further List A appearance against Middlesex in the 1970 Gillette Cup.  He bowled 12 wicket-less overs with the ball, while with the bat he dismissed for a duck by Keith Jones.

References

External links
William Rose at ESPNcricinfo
William Rose at CricketArchive

1934 births
Living people
Sportspeople from Great Yarmouth
English cricketers
Norfolk cricketers